Kurumba Maldives is a resort on the island of Vihamanaafushi, Located in the North Malé Atoll in the Maldives. Managed by Universal Resorts, Kurumba Maldives is the country's first Maldives resort. It was designed by architect Mohamed Shafeeq.

History
The resort opened in 1972 with its founders including local Maldivians, Mohamed Umar Maniku and Ahmed Naseem (Kerafa Naseem).

Awards and achievements
The awards and achievements by the resort include:

2008
 Indian Ocean's Leading Resort – World Travel Awards

2010
 Maldives’ Leading Hotel – World Travel Awards

2011
 Maldives’ Leading Hotel – World Travel Awards

2013
 Travellers’ Choice Awards for Best Service in the Maldives - TripAdvisor
 Travellers’ Choice Awards for Luxury in the Maldives - TripAdvisor
 Travellers’ Choice Awards, Top 25 Hotels in Maldives – TripAdvisor
 (Nominated) Indian Ocean's Leading Conference Hotel - World Travel Awards
 (Nominated) Maldives Leading Resort - World Travel Awards
 (Nominated) Maldives Leading Family Resort - World Travel Awards
 (Nominated) Maldives Leading Resort Spa - Luxury Travel Awards
 2013 Certificate of Excellence - TripAdvisor
 Top 100 Resorts in The World - Top Hotel
 No. 1 All-Inclusive Resort in Asia - TripAdvisor
 Top 25 All-Inclusive Resorts in the World - TripAdvisor
 Leading CSR Programme in the Maldives - MATATO

2014
 Best Spa Manager Award (Maldives) for Veli Spa - World Luxury Spa Awards
 Finalist for Best Luxury Resort Spa (Maldives) for Veli Spa - World Luxury Spa Awards
 2014 Certificate of Excellence - TripAdvisor
 No. 1 All-Inclusive Resort in Asia - TripAdvisor
 No. 3 All-Inclusive Resort Worldwide - TripAdvisor
 Leading CSR Programme in the Maldives – MATATO

2015
 Best Destination (Maldives) Spa Award for Veli Spa - World Luxury Spa Awards
 Top 10 Luxury Hotels – Maldives, TripAdvisor Travellers' Choice Awards
 Top 10 Hotels for Service – Maldives, TripAdvisor Travellers' Choice Awards
 Top 10 Hotels – Maldives, TripAdvisor Travellers' Choice Awards
 Number 1 All Inclusive Resort worldwide - TripAdvisors Travellers Choice Awards 
 Number 1 All Inclusive Resort Asia - Trip Advisors Travellers Choice Awards
 Kurumba Maldives - TripAdvisor Certificate of Excellence and Hall of Fame Award
 Veli Spa - TripAdvisor Certificate of Excellence
 Extreme Water Sports - TripAdvisor Certificate of Excellence
 Euro Divers - TripAdvisor Certificate of Excellence
 Top 3: Top Maldives Employer Award 2014 by Job-Maldives.com
 Travelife Gold Award

CSR Activities
 Party with a Purpose – Annual music festival charity event in support of the Kudhakudhinge Hiyaa Orphanage and Maafushi Island Education & Training Centre
 Running of Majaa Recreation involved in educating guests on marine environment conservation. url=http://www.kurumba.com/maldives-activities

Sponsorships
Kurumba Maldives is involved in sponsoring Advocating the Rights of Children (ARC), a non-governmental and non-profit organization involved in promoting children's rights in Maldives.

References

Resorts in the Maldives
Hotels established in 1972
1972 establishments in Asia